Calliostoma valkuri  is a species of sea snail, a marine gastropod mollusk in the family Calliostomatidae.

References

valkuri
Gastropods described in 2019